Dighalia Union is a union parishad in Dighalia Upazila of Khulna District, in Khulna Division, Bangladesh.

References

Unions of Dighalia Upazila
Populated places in Khulna District